Rosa Schwingschakl is an Italian luger who competed during the late 1970s. A natural track luger, she won the bronze medal in the women's singles event at the 1977 FIL European Luge Natural Track Championships in Seis am Schlern, Italy.

References

External links
Natural track European Championships results 1970-2006.

Italian female lugers
Italian lugers
Living people
Year of birth missing (living people)
Sportspeople from Südtirol